St Albans by-election may refer to one several parliamentary by-elections held in England for the House of Commons constituency of St Albans in Hertfordshire:

1904 St Albans by-election
1919 St Albans by-election
1943 St Albans by-election

See also 
 St Albans (UK Parliament constituency)